The Bangladesh Under-19 cricket team represents the nation of Bangladesh in cricket at Under-19 level. They have been playing official Under-19 ODI matches since 1997 including competing in the last twelve World Cups and are the defending champion. They won the Under-19 Cricket World Cup for the first time in 2020. They have also played eight youth Tests since 2004. Future international players to have represented the team include Mushfiqur Rahim, Shakib Al Hasan, Soumya Sarker, Mahmudullah Riyad, Mohammad Ashraful, Khaled Mashud, Mohammad Rafique, Rubel Hossain, Mustafizur Rahman,  Mashrafe Mortaza, Mehidy Hasan Miraz, Liton Das, Mohammad Saifuddain and many others.

Current squad
The current squad is announced 7 December 2021 by BCB.
Rakibul Hasan (c)
Prantik Nawrose Nabil (vc)
Tanzim Hasan Sakib
Aich Mollah
Mohammad Fahim
Musfik Hasan
Iftikher Hosain
Ariful Islam 
Mahfijul Islam 
Tahjibul Islam 
Abdullah Al Mamun 
S M Meherob Hasan
Ripon Mondol
Naimur Rohman 
AJ Ashikur Zaman
Tasdikur Rahman Tasdik

Ahosan Habib and Jishan Alam were both named as reserve players, with Mohiuddin Tareq, Tawhidul Islam Ferdus, Shakib Shahriyer and Golam Kibria named as standby players.

Records & statistics
International match summary-Bangladesh

As of 18 March 2023

Youth Test record versus other nations

Record complete to Youth Tests #289.Last updated 22 September  2021.

Youth ODI record versus other nations

Records complete to YODI #1433.Last updated 18 March 2023.

Youth T20I record versus other nations

Records complete to YT20I #14. Last updated 27 January 2019.

Supporting staff
 Head Coach —  Stuart Law
 Manager —  Sajal Ahmed Chowdhury 
Batting Coach: Wasim Jaffer

 Bowling Coach — Talha Jubair
 Fielding Coach —  Sohel Islam
 Training and Strengthening coach –  Richard Stonier
 Team physio —  Muzadded Alpha Sany

ACC Under-19 Asia Cup record

Under-19 World Cup record

Records in Under-19 World Cup

Team records
Highest team totals

Lowest team totals

Individual records
Most appearances
 15 – Aftab Ahmed, 2002-2004
 15 – Ashiqur Rahman, 2002-2004
 15 – Nafees Iqbal, 2002-2004
 14 – Hannan Sarkar, 1998-2000
 12 – Ashik Chowdhury, 2010-2012

Most career runs
 697- Ashik Chowdhury 2010-2012
 462 –  Liton Das, 2012-2014
 406 -  Shadman Islam, 2014

Highest individual scores

Most career wickets
 22 –  Enamul Haque jnr, 2004-2004
 19 –  Mehedy Hasan, 2014-2016
 15 –  Mehidy Hasan Miraz, 2014-2016
 14 –  Ranjan Das, 2000-2000

Best bowling figures

2020 Under-19 Cricket World Cup

In the 2020 World Cup, Bangladesh were group champion with 2 wins and a no result where they were placed along with Pakistan, Zimbabwe and Scotland. In the Super league Quarter final, they defeated the host South Africa by 104 runs and defeated New Zealand by 6 wickets in the Semi-final to reach the final for the first ever time.

Final
In the final, India, batting first gathered 177 runs before being all out. In reply, Bangladesh made a flying start as they scored 55 runs losing only a wicket in first 10 overs. Soon Indian leggie Ravi Bishnoi picked up 4 quick wickets as Bangladesh were 102 for 6 from 62/2 at the end of 25 overs. When Bangladesh were 163/7 at the end of 41 overs and the still needing 15 runs to win, rain arrives and the match was reduced to 46 overs with a revised target as per DLS method was 7 runs needing from 30 balls. From thereon, Bangladesh did not take any unnecessary risks and scored the winning run with 23 balls to spare and win their first ever ICC title by 3 wickets.
 Team of the final
Akbar Ali (c & wk), Towhid Hridoy (vc), Parvez Hossain Emon, Mahmudul Hasan Joy, Tanzid Hasan, Avishek Das, Shahadat Hossain, Shamim Hossain, Tanzim Hasan Sakib, Shoriful Islam, Rakibul Hasan.

See also
 Bangladesh national cricket team
 Bangladesh women's national cricket team
 Bangladesh A cricket team
 Bangladesh national under-23 cricket team
 Bangladesh women's national under-19 cricket team

References

External links
 ESPNcricinfo – 2012 Under-19 World Cup

Under-19 cricket teams
Bangladesh in international cricket
National sports teams of Bangladesh